The British Rail Class D3/6 were diesel shunters designed in 1934/5 by English Electric for the London, Midland and Scottish Railway. (LMS)

Prototype
Between 1931 and 1934, the LMS ordered nine prototype 0-6-0 diesel shunters of different designs. The last of these was based on the English Electric 6K of  diesel engine, with a long bonnet ("nose"), 0-6-0 wheel arrangement, EE 6K prime mover and two axle-hung traction motors. It was built by Hawthorne Leslie to English Electric design. Similar prototypes were later built for the Southern Railway (SR1-3), Great Western Railway (GWR2), and London and North Eastern Railway (8000-8004) and this configuration was repeated in most subsequent large diesel shunters built in Britain, such as the British Rail Class 11 and even more numerous British Rail Class 08 that entered service after World War II.

It was withdrawn and scrapped in 1956.

Production Series
These were numbered 7069-7078 by the LMS. Three of these later became British Railways numbers 12000–12002 (previously 7074/76/79 respectively). They spent their working lives allocated to Crewe South Locomotive Depot.

The remainder of the class were sold to the British War Department in 1940 and were shipped to France during World War II. Of these, the first production locomotive, No. 7069, survived the war and was used in industrial service in France. It was later repatriated for preservation and is currently located and being restored at the Berkeley Vale Railway.

Footnotes

References

See also
 LMS diesel shunters

London, Midland and Scottish Railway locomotives
War Department locomotives
D003.06
C locomotives
Hawthorn Leslie and Company locomotives
Railway locomotives introduced in 1934
Standard gauge locomotives of Great Britain
Diesel-electric locomotives of Great Britain